
Year 197 BC was a year of the pre-Julian Roman calendar. At the time it was known as the Year of the Consulship of Cethegus and Rufus (or, less frequently, year 557 Ab urbe condita). The denomination 197 BC for this year has been used since the early medieval period, when the Anno Domini calendar era became the prevalent method in Europe for naming years.

Events 
 By place 
 Asia Minor 
 Eumenes II becomes King of Pergamum following the death of his father Attalus I Soter.
 Antiochus III occupies parts of the kingdom of Pergamum and a number of Greek cities in Anatolia.

 Egypt 
 The Egyptian King, Ptolemy V, fights rebels in the Nile Delta, exhibiting great cruelty toward those of their leaders who capitulate.

 Greece 
 The Spartan ruler, Nabis, acquires the important city of Argos from Philip V of Macedon, as the price of his alliance with the Macedonians. Nabis then defects to the Romans in the expectation of being able to hold on to his conquest.
 The Battle of Cynoscephalae in Thessaly gives a Roman army under pro-consul Titus Quinctius Flamininus a decisive victory over Philip V of Macedon. In the Treaty of Tempe, the terms of the peace proposed by the Roman general and adopted by the Roman Senate specify that Philip V can retain his throne and control of Macedonia, but he has to abandon all the Greek cities he has conquered. Philip also has to provide to the Romans 1,000 talents as indemnity, surrender most of his fleet and provide hostages, including his younger son, Demetrius, who is to be held in Rome. The Aetolians propose that Philip V be ejected from his throne but Flamininus opposes this.
 The volcanic island of Hiera emerges from under the sea near Thera.

Hispania
 Hispania is divided into Hispania Ulterior and Hispania Citerior.
 The Iberian revolt breaks out in Citerior and Ulterior against Roman domination.

China
 Chen Xi begins a rebellion against the Han Dynasty in the Dai region of the northern frontier.

Deaths 
 Attalus I Soter, ruler of Pergamum from 241 BC, who has taken on the title of king after about 230 BC. Through his military and diplomatic skills, he has created a powerful kingdom in Anatolia (b. 269 BC)
 Liu Taigong, Chinese emperor of the Han Dynasty

References